"Employee of the Month" is the 30th episode of the HBO original series The Sopranos and the fourth episode of the show's third season. It was written by Robin Green and Mitchell Burgess, and directed by John Patterson, and originally aired on March 18, 2001.

Starring
 James Gandolfini as Tony Soprano
 Lorraine Bracco as Dr. Jennifer Melfi 
 Edie Falco as Carmela Soprano
 Michael Imperioli as Christopher Moltisanti
 Dominic Chianese as Corrado Soprano Jr. *
 Steven Van Zandt as Silvio Dante
 Tony Sirico as Paulie Gualtieri
 Robert Iler as Anthony Soprano Jr. (voice only)
 Jamie-Lynn Sigler as Meadow Soprano
 Drea de Matteo as Adriana La Cerva
 Aida Turturro as Janice Soprano
 Federico Castelluccio as Furio Giunta
 Joe Pantoliano as Ralph Cifaretto
* = credit only

Guest starring

Synopsis
Johnny Sack and his wife Ginny have moved to a large house in New Jersey. Tony goes there and asks Johnny insistently why he didn't tell him about it. Johnny says they moved there for family reasons and that he is not going to interfere in Tony's business.

Two Russian thugs break into Janice's home and demand the return of Svetlana's prosthetic leg. When Janice refuses, one of them hits her hard. The leg is in a bowling alley locker; Janice takes them there and gives it to them. Tony visits her in the hospital, exasperated with her again; he will have to retaliate against the men who assaulted his sister. Janice says she has hit bottom but feels born again in the Lord: "I give myself up utterly and totally to God."

Ralphie is now dating Rosalie, and takes Jackie, Jr. with him to collect extortion money. Ralphie has no dispute with the man there but provokes a fight. The man takes out a baseball bat, but Ralphie and Jackie take it from him. Ralphie holds the man and urges Jackie to hit him. Jackie eagerly beats and kicks him. Ralphie empties the man's wallet and gives some of the money to Jackie, who is gloating. Partly because of this incident, Tony makes Gigi a captain instead of Ralphie, to his deep disappointment.

Dr. Melfi and her ex-husband Richard are now reconciled. Both he and Dr. Elliot Kupferberg are urging her to cease treating her gangster patient, whose name she inadvertently reveals to Kupferberg. She has her own doubts: "I've been charmed by a sociopath," she says. She believes it is now time for him to be treated by a behavior modification therapist, but Tony is reluctant to talk to anyone else.

In the parking garage one evening after work, Dr. Melfi is attacked and raped. The police quickly find the man. Richard and her son Jason are enraged, especially when they are informed that, because of a loss in the chain of custody, the police had to release the rapist. Jennifer and Richard fight, blaming each other for the rape. Melfi later sees a picture of the man, named employee of the month at a local sub shop. She feels a crazed desire for revenge and knows she could obtain it with a word to Tony Soprano.

She has a dream. She buys a soda from a vending machine with a piece of macaroni; when she reaches into the machine to get it, her hand is trapped inside. A Rottweiler appears and terrifies her. Then the rapist advances toward her. The dog turns and mauls the rapist, who cries in agony. With Kupferberg, she understands the meaning: the dog is Tony Soprano taking revenge on her behalf.            

She tells Tony and others she has been in a car accident. When he sees her, Tony is shocked and concerned by her injuries. He tells her he is now ready to see a behaviorist, but she says, "No," and starts crying. Tony goes to her, lays his hands gently on her, and asks what the matter is. She composes herself and asks him to return to his seat. He goes back, but asks, "What? You wanna say something?" After a tense pause, she says, "No."

First appearances
 Ginny Sacrimoni: The wife of Johnny Sack.

Title reference
 Dr. Melfi happens to see her rapist's picture on the wall as "Employee of the Month" at a local subshop.

Awards
 The episode's writers, Robin Green and Mitchell Burgess, won an Emmy Award in 2001 for Best Writing in a Drama Series.
 Lorraine Bracco was nominated for an Emmy Award for Outstanding Lead Actress in a Drama Series for season three. She lost the award to co-star Edie Falco, who submitted the episode "Second Opinion".

Music 
 The song played over the end credits is "Fisherman's Daughter" by Daniel Lanois.
The song that plays while Ralphie and Jackie Aprile, Jr are eating at Vesuvio's is "Speedoo" by The Cadillacs.
 In the scene where Janice Soprano is practicing guitar, she is attempting "(I Can't Get No) Satisfaction" by The Rolling Stones
 In the scene where Dr. Melfi was at the sub shop (before fleeing), Britney Spears' song "Oops!... I Did It Again" is heard.
 The song played in The Bada Bing Club is "Love Rollercoaster" by The Ohio Players.
 The song played during the Sacrimoni's house warming party is "Americano" by the Brian Setzer Orchestra.

Reference to other media 
 Lorraine Bracco's character is raped by Jesus Rossi or J. Rossi. In the film Goodfellas, Lorraine Bracco's character also has a nemesis named J. Rossi (Janice Rossi), with whom her husband is having an affair.

Filming locations
Listed in order of first appearance:

 Long Island City, Queens
 North Caldwell, New Jersey
 Lodi, New Jersey
 Satin Dolls in Lodi, New Jersey
 Fort Lee, New Jersey
 Verona, New Jersey

References

External links
"Employee of the Month" at HBO

    

The Sopranos (season 3) episodes
2001 American television episodes
Television episodes about rape
Emmy Award-winning episodes
Television episodes directed by John Patterson (director)